Buraco do Padre is a waterfall and geological formation in the state of Parana, Brazil. It is located east-southeast of the city of Ponta Grossa.

Ponta Grossa
Waterfalls of Brazil